Jivaro or Jibaro, also spelled Hivaro or Hibaro, may refer to:

 Jíbaro (Puerto Rico), mountain-dwelling peasants in Puerto Rico
 Jíbaro music, a Puerto Rican musical genre
 Jivaroan peoples, indigenous peoples in northern Peru and eastern Ecuador
 Jívaro people or Shuar, one of the Jivaroan peoples
 Jivaro languages, a language family of northern Peru and eastern Ecuador
 Jivaro (film), a 1954 American 3-D film
 Jíbaro (film), English title Wild Dogs, a 1985 Cuban film
 Lake Jivaro, a reservoir in Shawnee County, Kansas, United States
 Jibaro, the final episode of season three of Love, Death + Robots which won several awards.

Language and nationality disambiguation pages